Dietlindenstraße is an U-Bahn station in Munich on the U6 line of the Munich U-Bahn system.

See also
List of Munich U-Bahn stations

References

External links

Munich U-Bahn stations
Railway stations in Germany opened in 1971
1971 establishments in West Germany